James Foster McDowell (December 3, 1825 – April 18, 1887) was an American lawyer and politician who served one term as a U.S. Representative from Indiana 1863 to 1865.

Biography 
Born in Mifflin County, Pennsylvania, McDowell moved with his parents to Ohio in 1835.
He attended the public schools.
He worked in a printing office.
He studied law.
He was admitted to the bar in 1846 and practiced.

He served as prosecuting attorney of Darke County, Ohio, in 1848.
He moved to Marion, Indiana, in 1851 and engaged in the practice of law.
He established the Marion Journal in 1851.

Congress 
McDowell was elected as a Democrat to the Thirty-eighth Congress (March 4, 1863 – March 3, 1865).
He was an unsuccessful candidate for reelection in 1864 to the Thirty-ninth Congress.

Later career and death 
He served as delegate to the Democratic National Convention in 1876.
He engaged in the practice of law in Marion, Indiana, until his death in that city April 18, 1887.
He was interred in Odd Fellows Cemetery.

References

1825 births
1887 deaths
People from Mifflin County, Pennsylvania
People from Marion, Indiana
Democratic Party members of the United States House of Representatives from Indiana
19th-century American politicians